Playboys is the second studio album by Finnish rock band The Rasmus (formerly known as "Rasmus") which was released on 29 August 1997 on Warner Music Finland.

It was certified Gold in Finland, and the single "Blue" also went Gold when it was released in May the same year. The album was not as popular outside their homeland Finland.

Besides the band members, there were many additional musicians (see below) that appeared on Playboys. This made the album sound very different from regular rock. With the singer Lauri Ylönen's rap vocals, it became more like rapcore.

Track listing
All tracks are written by The Rasmus.

"Playboys" – 2:45
"Blue" – 4:23
"Ice" – 2:47
"Sophia" – 2:43
"Wicked Moments" – 2:55
"Wellwell" – 3:21
"Sold" – 3:55
"Carousel" – 1:42
"Jailer" – 2:29
"Kola" – 3:51
"Raggatip" – 3:36
"Violence" – 2:23
"Panda" – 2:50

Personnel
The Rasmus
 Lauri Ylönen – vocals
 Pauli Rantasalmi – guitar
 Eero Heinonen – bass
 Janne Heiskanen – drums

Additional musicians
 Ilkka Hämäläinen – turntables, saxophones, panda 49, backing vocals
 Axel F. – trumpet
 Aleksi Ahoniemi – saxophone
 Matti Lappalainen – trombone
 Mamba Abdissa Assefa – percussion
 Timo Lavanko – alto saxophone, clarinet on "Panda"
 Tuukka Helminen – cello on "Blue"
 Tuomo Prättälä – Wurlitzer on "Sold"
 Mara Salminen – moog synth on "Wicked Moments", "Panda" and "Well Well"
 Hannu Pikkarainen – panda 49 on "Blue"
 Hanna Viitanen – steel pans on "Carousel"
 Essi Grönberg – backing vocals on "Raggatip" and "Wicked Moments"
 Katja Aakkula – backing vocals on "Raggatip"

Production and design
 The Rasmus and Illka Herkman – producers
 Juha Heininen and Illka Herkman – recorders, mixers
 Pauli Saastamoinen – mastering
 Braalot – sleeve
 Rascar – photographs

The Rasmus albums
1997 albums